Louise Erdrich (born Karen Louise Erdrich, June 7, 1954) is an American author of novels, poetry, and children's books featuring Native American characters and settings. She is an enrolled member of the Turtle Mountain Band of Chippewa Indians, a federally recognized tribe of Ojibwe people.

Erdrich is widely acclaimed as one of the most significant writers of the second wave of the Native American Renaissance. She has written 28 books in all, including fiction, non-fiction, poetry, and children's books. In 2009, her novel The Plague of Doves was a finalist for the Pulitzer Prize for Fiction and received an Anisfield-Wolf Book Award. In November 2012, she received the National Book Award for Fiction for her novel The Round House. She is a 2013 recipient of the Alex Awards. She was awarded the Library of Congress Prize for American Fiction at the National Book Festival in September 2015. In 2021, she was awarded the Pulitzer Prize for Fiction for her novel The Night Watchman.

She was married to author Michael Dorris and the two collaborated on a number of works. The couple separated in 1995.

She is also the owner of Birchbark Books, a small independent bookstore in Minneapolis that focuses on Native American literature and the Native community in the Twin Cities.

Personal life 
Erdrich was born on June 7, 1954, in Little Falls, Minnesota. She was the oldest of seven children born to Ralph Erdrich, a German-American, and Rita (née Gourneau), a Chippewa woman (of half Ojibwe and half French blood). Both parents taught at a boarding school in Wahpeton, North Dakota, set up by the Bureau of Indian Affairs. Erdrich's maternal grandfather, Patrick Gourneau, served as tribal chairman for the federally recognized tribe of Turtle Mountain Band of Chippewa Indians for many years. Though not raised in a reservation, she often visited relatives there. She was raised "with all the accepted truths" of Catholicism.

While Erdrich was a child, her father paid her a nickel for every story she wrote. Her sister Heidi became a poet and also lives in Minnesota; she publishes under the name Heid E. Erdrich. Another sister, Lise Erdrich, has written children's books and collections of fiction and essays.

Erdrich attended Dartmouth College from 1972 to 1976. She was a part of the first class of women admitted to the college and earned a B.A. in English. During her first year, Erdrich met Michael Dorris, an anthropologist, writer, and then-director of the new Native American Studies program. While attending Dorris' class, she began to look into her own ancestry, which inspired her to draw from it for her literary work, such as poems, short stories, and novels.  During that time, she worked as a lifeguard, waitress, researcher for films, and as an editor for the Boston Indian Council newspaper The Circle.

In 1978, Erdrich enrolled in a Master of Arts program at Johns Hopkins University in Baltimore, Maryland. She earned the Master of Arts in the Writing Seminars in 1979. Erdrich later published some of the poems and stories she wrote while in the M.A. program. She returned to Dartmouth as a writer-in-residence.

After graduating from Dartmouth, Erdrich remained in contact with Michael Dorris. He attended one of her poetry readings, became impressed with her work, and developed an interest in working with her. Although Erdrich and Dorris were on two different sides of the world, Erdrich in Boston and Dorris in New Zealand for field research, the two began to collaborate on short stories.

The pair's literary partnership led them to a romantic relationship. They married in 1981, and raised three children whom Dorris had adopted as a single parent (Reynold Abel, Madeline, and Sava) and three biological children together (Persia, Pallas, and Aza Marion). Reynold Abel suffered from fetal alcohol syndrome and in 1991, at age 23, he was killed when he was hit by a car. In 1995, their son Sava accused Dorris of committing child abuse; in 1997, after Dorris' death, his adopted daughter Madeline claimed that Dorris had sexually abused her and Erdrich had neglected to stop the abuse.

Dorris and Erdrich separated in 1995, and Dorris died by suicide in 1997. In his will, he omitted Erdrich and his adopted children Sava and Madeline.

In 2001, at age 47, Erdrich gave birth to a daughter, Azure, fathered by a Native American man Erdrich declines to identify publicly. She discusses her pregnancy with Azure, and Azure's father, in her 2003 non-fiction book, Books and Islands in Ojibwe Country. She uses the name "Tobasonakwut" to refer to him. He is described as a traditional healer and teacher, who is eighteen years Erdrich's senior and a married man. In a number of publications, Tobasonakwut Kinew, who died in 2012, is referred to as Erdrich's partner and the father of Azure.

When asked in an interview if writing is a lonely life for her, Erdrich replied, "Strangely, I think it is. I am surrounded by an abundance of family and friends and yet I am alone with the writing. And that is perfect." Erdrich lives in Minneapolis.

Work
In 1979 she wrote "The World's Greatest Fisherman", a short story about June Kashpaw, a divorced Ojibwe woman whose death by hypothermia brought her relatives home to a fictional North Dakota reservation for her funeral. She wrote this while "barricaded in the kitchen." At her husband's urging, she submitted it to the Nelson Algren Short Fiction prize in 1982, which it won, and eventually it became the first chapter of her debut novel, Love Medicine, published by Holt, Rinehart, and Winston in 1984.

"When I found out about the prize I was living on a farm in New Hampshire near the college I'd attended," Erdrich told an interviewer. "I was nearly broke and driving a car with bald tires. My mother knitted my sweaters, and all else I bought at thrift stores ... The recognition dazzled me. Later, I became friends with Studs Terkel and Kay Boyle, the judges, toward whom I carry a lifelong gratitude. This prize made an immense difference in my life."

Love Medicine won the 1984 National Book Critics Circle Award. It has also been featured on the National Advanced Placement Test for Literature.

In the early years of their marriage, Erdrich and Michael Dorris often collaborated on their work, saying they plotted the books together, "talk about them before any writing is done, and then we share almost every day, whatever it is we've written" but "the person whose name is on the books is the one who's done most of the primary writing." They got started with "domestic, romantic stuff" published under the shared pen name of "Milou North" (Michael + Louise + where they live).

In 1982, Erdrich's story, "The World's Greatest Fisherman," won $5,000 in the Nelson Algren fiction competition. She expanded the story into the novel Love Medicine (1984), which won the National Book Critics Circle Award for Fiction. It is the only debut novel ever to receive that honor. Erdrich later turned Love Medicine into a tetralogy that includes The Beet Queen (1986), Tracks (1988), and The Bingo Palace (1994).

During the publication of Love Medicine, Erdrich produced her first collection of poems, Jacklight (1984), which highlights the struggles between Native and non-Native cultures, as well as celebrating family, ties of kinship, autobiographical meditations, monologues, and love poetry. She incorporates elements of Ojibwe myths and legends. Erdrich continues to write poems, which have been included in her collections.

Erdrich is best known as a novelist, and has published a dozen award-winning and best-selling novels. She followed Love Medicine with The Beet Queen (1986), which continued her technique of using multiple narrators and expanded the fictional reservation universe of Love Medicine to include the nearby town of Argus, North Dakota.The action of the novel takes place mostly before World War II. Leslie Marmon Silko accused Erdrich's The Beet Queen of being more concerned with postmodern technique than with the political struggles of Native peoples.

Tracks (1988) goes back to the early 20th century at the formation of the reservation. It introduces the trickster figure of Nanapush, who owes a clear debt to Ojibwe figure Nanabozho. Tracks shows early clashes between traditional ways and the Roman Catholic Church. The Bingo Palace (1994), set in the 1980s, describes the effects of a casino and a factory on the reservation community. Tales of Burning Love (1997) finishes the story of Sister Leopolda, a recurring character from all the previous books, and introduces a new set of European-American people into the reservation universe.
	 
The Antelope Wife (1998), Erdrich's first novel after her divorce from Dorris, was the first of her novels to be set outside the continuity of the previous books. Erdrich revised parts of the book and published the revision as The Antelope Woman in 2016.

She subsequently returned to the reservation and nearby towns. She has published five novels since 1998 dealing with events in that fictional area. Among these are The Last Report on the Miracles at Little No Horse (2001) and The Master Butchers Singing Club (2003). Both novels have geographic and character connections with The Beet Queen.  In 2009, Erdrich was a Pulitzer Prize finalist for The Plague of Doves and a National Book Award finalist for The Last Report on the Miracles at Little No Horse. A Plague of Doves focuses on the historical lynching of four Native people wrongly accused of murdering a Caucasian family, and the effect of this injustice on the current generations. Her Pulitzer-Prize winning novel The Night Watchman (2020) concerns a campaign to defeat the 'termination bill' (introduced by Senator Arthur Vivian Watkins), and Erdrich acknowledged her sources and its inspiration being her maternal grandfather's life. Her most recent novel, The Sentence, tells the fictional story of a haunting at Erdirch's Minneapolis bookstore, set against the backdrop of the Covid pandemic, George Floyd's murder, and the resulting protests.

She also writes for younger audiences; she has a children's picture book Grandmother's Pigeon, and her children's book The Birchbark House, was a National Book Award finalist.  She continued the series with The Game of Silence, winner of the Scott O'Dell Award for Historical Fiction; and The Porcupine Year.

Nonfiction and teaching
In addition to fiction and poetry, Erdrich has published nonfiction. The Blue Jay's Dance (1995) is about her pregnancy and the birth of her first child. Books and Islands in Ojibwe Country (2003) traces her travels in northern Minnesota and Ontario's lakes following the birth of her youngest daughter.

Influence and style
Her heritage from both parents is influential in her life and prominent in her work. Although many of Erdrich's works explore her Native American heritage, her novel The Master Butchers Singing Club (2003) featured the European, specifically German, side of her ancestry. The novel includes stories of a World War I veteran of the German Army and is set in a small North Dakota town. The novel was a finalist for the National Book Award. 
	 	
Erdrich's interwoven series of novels have drawn comparisons with William Faulkner's Yoknapatawpha novels.  Like Faulkner's, Erdrich's successive novels created multiple narratives in the same fictional area and combined the tapestry of local history with current themes and modern consciousness.

Birchbark Books
Erdrich's bookstore hosts literary readings and other events. Her new works are read here, and events celebrate the works and careers of other writers as well, particularly local Native writers. Erdrich and her staff consider Birchbark Books to be a "teaching bookstore". In addition to books, the store sells Native art and traditional medicines, and Native American jewelry. Wiigwaas Press, a small nonprofit publisher founded by Erdrich and her sister, is affiliated with the store.

Awards
1975 American Academy of Poets Prize
1980 MacDowell Fellowship
1983 Pushcart Prize in Poetry
1984 National Book Critics Circle Award for Fiction, for Love Medicine
1984 Sue Kaufman Prize for Best First Novel, for Love Medicine
1984 Virginia McCormick Scully Literary Award d for Best Book of 1984 dealing with Indians or Chicanos
1985 Los Angeles Times book PrizeJoy Harjo
1985 Guggenheim Fellowship in Creative Arts
1987 O. Henry Award, for the short story "Fleur" (published in Esquire, August 1986)
1999 World Fantasy Award, for The Antelope Wife
2000 Lifetime Achievement Award from the Native Writers' Circle of the Americas
2005 Associate Poet Laureate of North Dakota
2006 Scott O'Dell Award for Historical Fiction, for the children's book "The Game of Silence"
2007 Honorary Doctorate from the University of North Dakota; refused by Erdrich because of her opposition to the university's North Dakota Fighting Sioux mascot
2009 Honorary Doctorate (Doctor of Letters) from Dartmouth College
2009 Kenyon Review Award for Literary Achievement
2009 Anisfield-Wolf Book Award, for Plague of Doves 
2012 National Book Award for Fiction for The Round House
2013 Rough Rider Award
2013 Scott O'Dell Award for Historical Fiction for Chickadee
2014 Dayton Literary Peace Prize, Richard C. Holbrooke Distinguished Achievement Award
2014 PEN/Saul Bellow Award for Achievement in American Fiction
2015 Library of Congress Prize for American Fiction
2016 National Book Critics Circle Award for Fiction, for LaRose
2021 Pulitzer Prize for Fiction, for The Night Watchman
2022 Berresford Prize for significant contributions to the advancement and care of artists in society

Bibliography

See also
List of writers from peoples indigenous to the Americas
Female Native Authors For Your Reading List
Joy Harjo
Terese Marie Mailhot

References

External links

 Western American Literature Journal: Louise Erdrich
 
 
  35 catalog records
 

1954 births
20th-century American novelists
20th-century American poets
20th-century American short story writers
20th-century American women writers
21st-century American novelists
21st-century American poets
21st-century American women writers
American Book Award winners
American children's writers
American people of French descent
American people of German descent
American women children's writers
American women novelists
American women poets
American women short story writers
Artists from Minnesota
Dartmouth College alumni
Living people
MacDowell Colony fellows
Magic realism writers
Members of the American Academy of Arts and Letters
National Book Award winners
Native American children's writers
Native American novelists
Native American poets
Native American short story writers
Native American women writers
Novelists from Minnesota
O. Henry Award winners
Ojibwe people
PEN/Faulkner Award for Fiction winners
People from Little Falls, Minnesota
People from Wahpeton, North Dakota
Postmodern writers
Pulitzer Prize for Fiction winners
The New Yorker people
World Fantasy Award-winning writers
Writers from North Dakota
20th-century Native American women
20th-century Native Americans
21st-century Native American women
21st-century Native Americans
Native American people in Minnesota